Keong Emas (Javanese and Indonesian for Golden Snail) is a popular Javanese folklore about a princess magically transformed and contained in a golden snail shell. The folklore is a part of popular Javanese Panji cycle telling the stories about the prince Panji Asmoro Bangun (also known as Raden Inu Kertapati) and his consort, princess Dewi Sekartaji (also known as Dewi Chandra Kirana).

The story

There are several versions of Keong Emas known in Indonesia. The most common one is the legend describing the romance, the separation and reunion of Raden Panji Asmoro Bangun and his wife Dewi Sekartaji. It all starts when the King of Antah Berantah kingdom desired to take Dewi Sekartaji as his wife, and to do so he kidnapped her. The god Batara Narada saved Dewi Sekartaji by changing her into a golden snail. The god told Keong Emas to drift along the river in order to find her husband, Raden Panji Asmoro Bangun.

One day a poor old widow, Mbok Rondo Dadapan, who always fished along the river, found the golden snail and took it home as a pet. There, she put the snail in a jar and took good care of it. All of sudden, the unexpected good things took place in Mbok Rondo's life.

Coming back from her daily fishing, she would find delicious dishes on the table and the house is cleaned. She wondered who had been so nice to take care of her house, to do the cooking and house chores. This strange event went on for several days, she could not resist to find out who was the mysterious and kind person was. So, one day, instead of fishing, she peeped through a hole in the wall of her house.

After waiting and hiding, finally she saw an amazing scene. She saw a beautiful princess coming out of the jar and starting to clean the house and preparing the meal.

The next day, the same thing happened. Without wasting any time Mbok Rondo rushed into the house and smashed the jar altogether with the snail shell in it with stone mortar. The homeless Dewi Sekartaji could not turn back into a snail shell, and the magic spell was broken. She was then adopted by Mbok Rondo as her daughter.

Meanwhile, Raden Panji Asmoro Bangun searching for his wife. He wandered from one village to another, finally reaching Dadapan village where he found his beloved wife. Filled with happiness and love, they went back to their kingdom, taking  good old Mbok Rondo.

Other versions
There are several versions of the story concerning the cause of the princess being magically turned into a golden snail. One version told that Dewi Sekartaji was transformed by Batara Narada to help her escape from captivity, another version told about a magic curse cast upon her by a witch by her jealous sister, Dewi Galuh Ajeng, that also desired to marry prince Panji. And another version told where the princess accidentally stepped on a snail and broke its shell, the snail was an evil witch in disguise, who then put a curse upon the princess. While the other parts of the story, where the princess was saved by an old widow and she periodically transformed back to her human form to repay the kindness of the old widow and finally reunited with her husband, remains the same.

Popular culture

Keong Emas is a popular Indonesian fairytale told for generations and often featured in many children's storybooks. The moral is to teach the children to be kind and grateful, willing to repay the kindness they have received from others. The tale of Keong Emas inspired the architectural design of Keong Emas IMAX Theatre in Taman Mini Indonesia Indah, Jakarta.

See also
Sang Thong (Golden Conch, Thai folktale)
Ureongi gaksi (The Snail Bride, Korean folktale)

References

Javanese mythology
Javanese folklore
Indonesian legendary creatures
Female legendary creatures